T.R. Udayakumar (born 28 May 1965) is an Indian contemporary artist living in Kottayam, Kerala.

He was a former Executive Committee Member of Kerala Lalithakala Akademi and Co-ordinating Editor of ‘Chithra Vartha Bulletin’, Kerala Lalithakala Akademi Publication (2013 November-2016 May).

Biography
Udayakumar born in Kotayam district and completed his studies in painting from Raja Ravi Varma College of Fine Arts

Solo exhibitions
 ‘Continuing Ephemera’, Lalithakala Akademi Art Gallery, Thiruvananthapuram, 2018,
‘Untitled’, Public Library Art Gallery, Kottayam, Kerala, 2016.
 ‘Wounded Dreams’, Durbar Hall Art Center, Ernakulam, Kerala, 2016.
 ‘Hounting Insights’, Lalithakala Lalithakala Akademi Art Gallery, Kottayam, Kerala,
 ‘Dream Within A Dream’, Lalithakala Akademi Art Gallery, Alappuzha, Kerala, 2015.
 ‘Metaphors of Power’, 2015 Durbar Hall Art Center, Ernakulam, Kerala, 2014.
 ‘Metaphors of Power’, Lalithakala Akademi Art Gallery, Kottayam, Kerala, 2013.
 ‘Metaphors of Power’, Museum Art Gallery, Thiruvananthapuram, Kerala, 2013.
 ‘Lalithakala Akademi Art Gallery’, Kottayam, Kerala, 2012.
 ‘Lalithakala Akademi Art Gallery’, Kottayam, Kerala, 2011.
 ‘Exhibition of Drowing and Paintings’, Press Club Art Gallery, Ernakulam, Kerala, 2011.
 ‘Public Library Art Gallery, Kottayam’, Kerala 2009.

References

External links 
 Theyyam throbs on canvas
 Monsoon, the first online art expo, begins
 Artists from Alappuzha to camp at Vembanad Lake
 METAJINGLE
 Monsoon Art Fest brings together generations of artists
 Sculpted with love
 A helping hand to artists
 Art casts the net: Many artists shift base online as COVID-19 continues to rage

1965 births
Indian contemporary painters
Living people
Raja Ravi Varma College of Fine Arts alumni
Painters from Kerala
People from Kottayam district
20th-century Indian painters
21st-century Indian painters